Ribière is a French surname. Notable people with the surname include:

 Germaine Ribière (1917–1999), French Catholic, member of the Résistance
 Hippolyte Ribière (1822–1885), French lawyer and politician
 René Ribière (1922–1998), French politician

French-language surnames